Two referendums were held in Switzerland in 1876. The first was held on 23 April on the subject of distributing and cashing of banknotes, and was rejected by 61.7% of voters. The second was held on 9 July on a federal law on taxation of compensation for not serving in the military, and was rejected by 54.2% of voters.

Background
Both referendums were classed as "optional referendums", which meant that only a majority of the public vote was required for them to pass, as opposed to the mandatory referendums that required both a majority of voters and cantons to approve the proposals.

Results

Banknotes

Military taxation

References

1876 referendums
1876 in Switzerland
Referendums in Switzerland